Gentle Glacier is a small glacier lobe, to the east and immediately below Forecastle Summit, which drains south into deglaciated Barnacle Valley in the Convoy Range of Victoria Land, Antarctica. Though a part of the Northwind Glacier – Fry Glacier system, this diminished glacier flows back into Barnacle Valley. The name was proposed by New Zealand geologist Christopher J. Burgess and describes the glacier, but also the excellent helicopter support provided to his 1976–77 field party by U.S. Navy helicopters, "Gentle" being their code name.

References

Glaciers of Victoria Land
Scott Coast